The 1997 Davis Cup World Group Qualifying Round was held from 20 to 22 September. They were the main play-offs of the 1997 Davis Cup. The winners of the playoffs advanced to the 1998 Davis Cup World Group, and the losers were relegated to their respective Zonal Regions I.

Teams
Bold indicates team had qualified for the 1998 Davis Cup World Group.

From World Group

 
 
 
 
 
 
 
 

 From Americas Group I

 
 

 From Asia/Oceania Group I

 
 

 From Europe/Africa Group I

Results summary
Date: 19–21 September

The eight losing teams in the World Group first round ties and eight winners of the Zonal Group I final round ties competed in the World Group Qualifying Round for spots in the 1997 World Group.

Qualifying results

Zimbabwe vs. Austria

Brazil vs. New Zealand

India vs. Chile

Belgium vs. France

Germany vs. Mexico

Russia vs. Romania

Canada vs. Slovakia

Switzerland vs. South Korea

References

External links
Davis Cup official website

World Group Qualifying Round